Saint Paul Central High School is the oldest continuously operating high school in the state of Minnesota, United States. Founded in 1866 in downtown Saint Paul, Central has educated many leaders in business, government, literature, arts, sciences, and education throughout the state of Minnesota and the United States.

It is also one of the biggest high schools in the state and, as of 2011, the second-largest in the city of Saint Paul, after Harding Senior High School on the east side of the city. It is also a national Blue Ribbon School.

History
Central High School has been situated in four locations, beginning with the first building in 1866.

1866 (third floor of Franklin School Building)
Central High School was founded in 1866 in response to student requests. Before 1866, there were no educational opportunities in Saint Paul beyond grade school. About a dozen students wished to continue their schooling so, in 1866, two rooms were set aside for the "High School" on the third floor of the Franklin School building, located at Broadway and Tenth Streets in downtown Saint Paul. Some people thought that the school was a waste of space. Eugene Foster (known as the "Father of the High School") was the principal, and Mrs. H.M. Haynes was the lone teacher. The first graduating class of the Saint Paul High School was in 1870, and consisted of two students: Fannie Haynes (the daughter of the teacher), and A. P. Warren. The first 2 diplomas were hand printed on sheepskin. Gradually, the classes enrolled in the Franklin Building became too large for the two little rooms to accommodate them.

1872 (Lindeke Building, 7th and Jackson, second floor)
In 1872, the Saint Paul High School moved to the Lindeke Building at 7th and Jackson streets where it occupied the second floor. That year, graduation exercises were held in the Saint Paul Civic Opera House where they were held until it was destroyed by a fire in 1899. Then the commencement exercises were held in the People's Church until the completion of the Saint Paul Auditorium. In 1872, the 
graduating class consisted of 12 students: five boys and seven girls.

In 1873, the graduating class of 12 students originated the custom of presenting each senior with a souvenir appropriate to his/her character. For several years, a prize was offered for the best essay: a Webster's Unabridged Dictionary and a holder for it. The President of the Board of Education also presented a prize to the one having the highest standing in the class, usually a fine set of Shakespeare's works.

1883/1888 (10th and Minnesota)
 
A new building opened in 1883 at 10th and Minnesota streets. The building was the first high school built in Saint Paul. In 1888, a 14-room annex was added for laboratories, but there was no money for an astronomical observatory. The Debate society decided to put on plays to make up the money to pay for it. Soon, Central was known as the only high school in the United States to have a fixed telescope with a lens ground and polished by the great telescope maker Alvan Clark (1804–1887), whose company built some of the largest and best telescopes in the world, including the telescope for the Lowell Observatory in Flagstaff, Arizona. Mechanics Arts High School, then known as Manual Training High School, was first housed in the basement of Central. The school was renamed Central High School in 1888.

Soon the building on 10th and Minnesota Street became too small, and the corner of Marshall and Lexington Avenues was chosen as the new site.

1912 (Marshall and Lexington)

A new school, designed by Clarence H. Johnston Sr., was built in 1912 on the corner of Marshall Avenue and Lexington Parkway, and was attempted to be renamed Lexington High School; alumni, however, wanted to keep the moniker Central High School. A compromise was reached when the Minuteman was adopted as a logo and mascot. In other words, the name of the school was retained, but for those who wanted the school to be named "Lexington," its logo and mascot were named after the colonial militia men of 1775 at Lexington, Massachusetts, who fought against the British in the first skirmishes of the War of Independence, and were required to be ready at a minute's notice. The adjacent stadium was built in the early 1940s by the WPA (Works Progress Administration), as denoted by a plaque on the brick facade of the stands. It was renamed James Griffin Stadium in 1998.

1912 Marshall/Lexington building construction:

Working name – West End High School 
Proposed name – Lexington High School 
Final name – Central High School

Architect -   Clarence H. Johnston Sr. - prominent Saint Paul architect, studied architecture in Saint Paul as well as MIT, and the École des Beaux-Arts in Paris, travelled Europe and Asia. Also designed houses for Summit Ave, buildings for the University of Minn, many others.

Architectural Artist – JC Trott (employed by the architect) 
Style – Collegiate Gothic 
Land purchased – 1909 
Designed – 1909–1910 
Building Permit Issued – May 31, 1910 
Builder – C. Ash Company 
Construction started – 1910 
Ready for occupancy – 1911 (old school dropped from City Directory) 
Cornerstone laid – April, 1912 (building completed) 
Flagpole installed – 1914

New gymnasium – 1924 (added to the west side of the school, replacing the old one in the top floor of the middle section; see 1925 yearbook, history of Johnston's career, and spps history document)

Stadium – 1940/1943 depending on the source (building permits or spps). 
Cost for 1909–1943 – $650,000 (not counting maintenance, heating, etc.)

1970s and 80s (Marshall and Lexington)

Rebuilding and modernization took place in the 1970s and 80s. Led by Ellerbe Architects in 1979, the "castle" exterior was removed or overlaid with cement, a pool and other athletic facilities were added, and the interior was gutted and rebuilt. The building now uses only the structural frame of the previous building. This resulted in a joke amongst students that it was designed by a prison architect because of the school's rather utilitarian exterior, metal gates, and few windows on ground level. Larry Millett, a local architecture critic described the building as, "The nadir of modern school architecture in Saint Paul, a building so resolutely grim and uninviting that it suggests that education can only be viewed as a form of incarceration." Until 2006 a barbed wire fence extended around Griffin Stadium and portions of the school facing Interstate 94 and Lexington contributing to the joke. In August 2013 the fence was replaced with new black vinyl fencing funded by the Lexington-Hamline Community Council, the St Paul School District ISD 625 and a Saint Paul Neighborhood Star grant.  A parent-led effort to improve the appearance, function, and sustainability of the building, "Transforming Central," was initiated in 2011.

Academics
Central offers many higher-level classes. It has offered the International Baccalaureate program since 1988. Central has the second largest IB program in the state of Minnesota. Students may also take Advanced Placement classes and their subsequent tests. Central was the only high school in Minnesota to be honored by the Siemens Foundation in their 2007-08 Siemens Awards for Advanced Placement. Central received the award for "its commitment to students and leadership in AP participation and performance". In 1970 Central began to offer the Quest program, the first gifted and talented program approved by Saint Paul Public Schools. This humanities based program was started in order to offer in-depth topics in the humanities that were not available in normal classes. The program continues to challenge students to think independently and to learn from each other and from the teacher in a discussion-based approach towards learning. Over 15 Quest classes are currently offered including classes on world culture, film documentary, ancient civilizations, the Harlem Renaissance and Shakespeare literature. Central has participated in the University of Minnesota‘s College in the Schools program since 1994.  As of 2018, Central High School was the only public high school in Minnesota to offer Russian as a foreign language. It also offers the only French Immersion program in the Saint Paul Public School District. In addition to Russian, Central has the only Latin language program in the Saint Paul Public Schools District as well.

Arts

Central offers music classes including Concert Band, Varsity Band, Orchestra, Central Chamber Singers, Mixed Choir, Tenor Bass Choir, and Soprano Alto Choir.  Co-Curricular opportunities include Orchestra, Chamber Orchestra, Jazz Band, student led choirs such Minnesingers, Meistersingers, and North Star Singers, as well as the Music Listening Contest.  Central performing ensembles have traveled in recent years to Washington, DC, San Diego, New Orleans, New York City, San Francisco, Chicago, and Nashville.  The Central Concert Band and Orchestra were selected to perform at the 2007 MMEA Mid Winter Clinic.  The Central Concert Choir performed at the ACDA-MN 2006 Fall Convention and the Central Singers were selected to perform at the 2007 Choral Arts Finale at Orchestra Hall.  The Central Orchestra performed at Orchestra Hall in January 2007, opening for the Minnesota Orchestra, as part of the Music-Up-Close series.  The Central IB Music program offers instruction in music theory, history, composition, and solo-performance.

Central was also known for its BlackBox Theater Program with the advance acting troupe known as Central Touring Theatre (CTT). CTT was founded 30 years ago as a safe space for youth to explore artistic expression as a powerful and meaningful force in the world. Theater company members came from a variety of racial, ethnic and socioeconomic backgrounds. St. Paul Central High School's Central Touring Theater (CTT) has created original social justice theater and the  juniors and seniors became the teachers to the audience as they used theater to present important issues that resonate in their lives, including racism, sexism, depression, abuse and more. CTT's last production was during the 2014-2015 school year as the founder and leader of the program Jan Mandell retired with over 30 years teaching theatre in Saint Paul Public Schools. CTT predecessors that are keeping the legacy going are Washburn Touring Theatre at Washburn High School in Minneapolis under the direction of Crystal Spring and Global Arts Plus Upper Campus under the direction of Eliza Rasheed.

Athletics
Central has produced a long line of talented athletes, the most notable being Major League Baseball Hall of Fame inductee Dave Winfield. More recently, Central's athletics programs displayed their dominance when they won the 2008 St. Paul City Conference in every fall athletics category. Other sports includes volleyball, tennis, badminton, etc.

Girls basketball

In the 2006–2007 season, the Central high school girls basketball team set a state record for most victories in a single season, going 32–0 en route to the class AAAA state championship. During their perfect season, Central was considered by some to be the best team in the history of Minnesota High School girls basketball. Central beat their opponents by an average of 44 points per game, averaged 86 PPG and had all five starters average more than 10 PPG. In addition, the 2006–2007 girls basketball team served as grand marshals for the 2007 Rondo Days parade.

Overall, Central has won four state titles in girls basketball: 1976, 1979, 2007, and 2008.

Boys baseball 
In the 2022 baseball season, the Central high school varsity boys baseball team ended their season in First within the Saint Paul conference. Not only did they place first, the team completely swept the competition, being the first to do so in at least 15 years.

Girls Volleyball 
Central high school has also produced many D1 athletes.

Extracurricular activities
Central High School has a plethora of extracurricular activities including National Honors Society, math team, Debate, Ski club and more.

Math team 
Central's math team has also been highly successful. In 2007, led by Nick Arnosti, who did not miss a single point in the regular season, the math team was undefeated and won the state championship, scoring a state record number of points at the tournament.

Debate 
Central High School is home to a nationally recognized policy debate program. The current program was founded by 2007 graduates Molly Schnell and Maureen O'Brien in 2004, the program has since grown to a roster size of 14 in the 2006–2007 season under the leadership of coach Dan Allen. The team qualified juniors Ben Quam and Ilias Karim, who is the brother of Central High School alum Jawed Karim, to the quarterfinals of the Minnesota State High School League Policy Debate Quarterfinals as the fourth seeded team before they were eliminated by Edina High School's seniors Doug Gschneidner and Logan Chin. In 2008, the team consisting of Ilias Karim and Ben Quam faced Highland Park High School at the final round of the Minnesota state debate tournament. In 2010, the team of Laura Johnson and Steve Quam reached the quarter-finals of the Tournament of Champions (debate) and Johnson was the 9th place speaker. Laura Johnson was also the second place speaker at the National Forensic League tournament that year. In 2012, the team of Hannah Nesser and Imanol Avendano reached the semi-finals of the National Urban Debate League tournament. In 2013, Ayaan Natala became the first African-American to reach the final round of the Minnesota State High School League tournament. The school has trophies from debate tournaments going back to the early 20th Century. 

Central High School has also improved its Mock Trial team dramatically in recent years. Under the coaching of Stacey Sorensen and Prof. Peter Knapp, the Mock Trial team, captained by Elizabeth "Liz" Lee and PaFoua Hang, reached the state competition for the first time in 2007 as regional champions, and again in 2008 captained by Charlie Armitz and Sarah Ludwig.

Notable alumni

 Neal R. Amundson, head of the University of Minnesota's chemical engineering department, 1949-1974; known as the "father of modern chemical engineering"
 Martin Apple (1956), molecular biologist and president of the Council of Scientific Society Presidents
 Jeanne Arth, former U.S Open Doubles champion and Wimbledon Doubles champion
 Rita Bell, singer and actress
 Micah Boyd, 2008 Summer Olympics crew rower
 Melvin Carter, current mayor of Saint Paul
 Joshua Cain, co-founder and lead guitarist of American pop punk band Motion City Soundtrack
 Elijah Campbell, American football player.
 Midge Decter, editor and author
 Thomas M. Disch, science fiction writer and poet
 John Drew, Minnesota state legislator and businessman
 Colton Dunn, actor and comedian
 Amelia Earhart, aviation pioneer and women's rights advocate, attended briefly before moving to Chicago
 Dave Frishberg, jazz musician and author of "I'm Just a Bill"
 Michael J. George, Minnesota state legislator
 Leigh Kamman, jazz musician and radio host
 Jawed Karim, co-founder of YouTube
 Jeff Loots, gridiron football player
 Harvey Mackay, Chairman of MackayMitchell Envelope and New York Times Best Selling Author of Swim With The Sharks
 Joe Mande, actor and comedian
 E.D.I. Mean, born Malcolm Greenidge, member of rap group Outlawz
 Frederick Joseph Miller, Minnesota state senator and lawyer
 Gordon Parks, photographer, filmmaker, and writer.
 Stacy Robinson, National Football League wide receiver with the New York Giants who has two Super Bowl championships
 John Roethlisberger, three time Olympic gymnast
 Dua Saleh, poet and rapper
 T. Denny Sanford (grad. 1954), banker and ranked #117 on Forbes list of richest Americans
 Charlie Sanders, actor and comedian
 Susie Scanlan, bronze-medal winning fencer at the 2012 Olympics
 Charles M. Schulz, author of the Peanuts comic strip 
 Richard M. Schulze, founder of Best Buy
 Max Shulman, a 20th-century American writer and humorist best known for his television and short story character Dobie Gillis
 Don Simensen, American football player
 DJ Skee, DJ, radio personality, producer, and television host
 Danez Smith, poet
 Nick Swardson, actor and stand-up comedian
 Jon Wiener, historian and political commentator
 Stokley Williams, American singer, record producer, and percussionist
 Dave Winfield, Baseball Hall of Fame left fielder

Records
Records of Central High School are available for research use.  They consist of historical data, programs, invitations, and handbooks, pupil lists, subject files, scrapbooks and photographs, documenting a wide variety of school activities and events, and correspondence and newspaper clippings about former pupil Amelia Earhart.

References

External links
 

Educational institutions established in 1866
High schools in Saint Paul, Minnesota
International Baccalaureate schools in Minnesota
Public high schools in Minnesota
1866 establishments in Minnesota